Anita Carina Ljungdahl (born 21 February 1960 in Filipstad, Värmland) is a Swedish former freestyle swimmer. She won a silver medal in 4 × 100 m freestyle relay at the 1980 Summer Olympics in Moscow along with Tina Gustafsson, Agneta Mårtensson, Agneta Eriksson.

Clubs
 Filipstads IF

References
 

1960 births
Living people
Olympic swimmers of Sweden
Swimmers at the 1980 Summer Olympics
Olympic silver medalists for Sweden
Swedish female freestyle swimmers
Medalists at the 1980 Summer Olympics
Olympic silver medalists in swimming